Signal transducer and activator of transcription 3 (STAT3) is a transcription factor which in humans is encoded by the STAT3 gene. It is a member of the STAT protein family.

Function 
STAT3 is a member of the STAT protein family. In response to cytokines and growth factors, STAT3 is phosphorylated by receptor-associated Janus kinases (JAK), forms homo- or heterodimers, and translocates to the cell nucleus where it acts as a transcription activator. Specifically, STAT3 becomes activated after phosphorylation of tyrosine 705 in response to such ligands as interferons, epidermal growth factor (EGF), Interleukin (IL-)5 and IL-6. Additionally, activation of STAT3 may occur via phosphorylation of serine 727 by Mitogen-activated protein kinases (MAPK) and through c-src non-receptor tyrosine kinase. STAT3 mediates the expression of a variety of genes in response to cell stimuli, and thus plays a key role in many cellular processes such as cell growth and apoptosis.

STAT3-deficient mouse embryos cannot develop beyond embryonic day 7, when gastrulation begins. It appears that at these early stages of development, STAT3 activation is required for self-renewal of embryonic stem cells (ESCs). Indeed, LIF, which is supplied to murine ESC cultures to maintain their undifferentiated state, can be omitted if STAT3 is activated through some other means.

STAT3 is essential for the differentiation of the TH17 helper T cells, which have been implicated in a variety of autoimmune diseases. During viral infection, mice lacking STAT3 in T-cells display impairment in the ability to generate T-follicular helper (Tfh) cells and fail to maintain antibody based immunity.

STAT3 caused upregulation in E-selectin, a factor in metastasis of cancers. 

Hyperactivation of STAT3 occurs in COVID-19 infection and other viral infections.

Clinical significance 

Loss-of-function mutations in the STAT3 gene result in Hyperimmunoglobulin E syndrome, associated with recurrent infections as well as disordered bone and tooth development.

Gain-of-function mutations in the STAT3 gene have been reported to cause multi-organ early onset auto-immune diseases; such as thyroid disease, diabetes, intestinal inflammation, and low blood counts, while constitutive STAT3 activation is associated with various human cancers and commonly suggests poor prognosis. It has anti-apoptotic as well as proliferative effects.

STAT3 can promote oncogenesis by being constitutively active through various pathways as mentioned elsewhere. A tumor suppressor role of STAT3 has also been reported.  In the report on human glioblastoma tumor, or brain cancer, STAT3 was shown to have an oncogenic or a tumor suppressor role depending upon the mutational background of the tumor. A direct connection between the PTEN-Akt-FOXO axis (suppressive) and the leukemia inhibitory factor receptor beta (LIFRbeta)-STAT3 signaling pathway (oncogenic) was shown.

Increased activity of STAT3 in cancer cells, leads to changes in the function of protein complexes that control expression of inflammatory genes, with result profound change in the secretome and the cell phenotypes, their activity in the tumor, and their capacity for metastasis.

Interactions 

STAT3 has been shown to interact with:

 AR, 
 ELP2, 
 EP300, 
 EGFR, 
 HIF1A, 
 JAK1, 
 JUN 
 KHDRBS1, 
 mTOR, 
 MYOD1, 
 NDUFA13, 
 NFKB1, 
 NR3C1, 
 NCOA1, 
 PML,
 RAC1, 
 RELA, 
 RET, 
 RPA2, 
 STAT1, 
 Stathmin,
 Src,  and
 TRIP10. 
 KPNA4. 

Niclosamide seems to inhibit the STAT3 signalling pathway.

Nicotinamide (a type of Vitamin B3) naturally inhibits STAT3.  However NAC (Acetylcysteine) inhibits STAT3 inhibitors.

References

Further reading

External links 
 

Gene expression
Immune system
Proteins
Transcription factors
Signal transduction
Moonlighting proteins